Here is a list of hospitals in Hungary.

Central Hungary

Budapest

Pest County

Western Transdanubia

Central Transdanubia

Southern Transdanubia

Northern Hungary

Northern Great Plain

Southern Great Plain

See also 
Healthcare in Hungary

References 
Budapest City Atlas, Szarvas-Dimap, Budapest, 2011, 
Magyarország autóatlasz, Dimap-Szarvas, Budapest, 2004, 
Clinics and hospitals of the University of Pécs

Notes 

Hungary
Hospitals

Hungary